First ladies and gentlemen of Ecuador are the wives and husbands of the presidents of Ecuador. There has been only one first gentleman of Ecuador to date, Eduardo Peña Triviño, the husband of former acting president Rosalía Arteaga Serrano.

List of first ladies and gentlemen of Ecuador

Type of government:

First ladies and gentlemen of Ecuador

Type of Government:   

Ecuador
Lists of Ecuadorian people
Ecuador politics-related lists